Mick Watson (born 1966 in Sydney) is an Australian businessman and the director of sports at Rangitoto College.

Early life 
Watson attended Marist Brothers Parramatta in Sydney's western suburbs, representing the school in cricket, rugby league, athletics and swimming.

Between 1986 and 1992, Watson was employed by Coca-Cola, moving through the ranks of marketing and sales. From 1992 to 1998 Watson was with Pepsi Cola, working with athletes, creating sports sponsorship and he was also responsible for sports and event marketing.

He joined Kellogg's in 1998 after working for 12 years within the 'Cola Wars'. He was responsible for re-engineering sports properties and helping Kellogg's deliver their business plan for the first time in 19 years.

New Zealand Warriors 
In November 2000, Watson was appointed chief executive officer of the New Zealand Warriors, shortly after chairman Eric Watson purchased the New Zealand licence to compete in the National Rugby League.

Watson was involved with the club when they made the finals series of the NRL for 3 consecutive years (2001, 2002 and 2003). Under his leadership the club secured its first title, winning the J.J. Giltinan Shield for the minor premiership in 2002. The same year the Warriors made its NRL Grand Final for the first time.

Watson resigned from the Warriors at the end of the 2005 season.

Warriors' majority shareholder Eric Watson said Watson had played a huge role in rebuilding the club. "When we had problems in 2004, Mick had to remove himself from Cullen Sports projects and come back into the rugby league business," he said. During Watson's time at the Warriors, the club reached the NRL finals for the first time in their history (2001), repeated the feat the next two seasons and, in 2002, also won the minor premiership and made the grand final for the first time but in the past two years he has fallen out with leading media outlets for periods.

Boxing 
Watson created the Cullen Sports boxing division which includes New Zealand Heavyweight Shane Cameron (former IBF Australasian, IBF Pan Pacific).

In 2007 Watson and former Rugby League star Monty Betham formed WAAAM Boxing and created Dodge Fight Night. A professional Boxing event that was broadcast live on TVNZ in New Zealand and delayed to Australia and Samoa. WAAAM Boxing promoted Anthony Mundine, Steven Heremia, Tyrone Brunson, Peter Kariuki and Mohammed Azzaiouii.

Other work
During his tenure as CEO Cullen Sports, Watson wrote and created Prime's first NZ produced product – The Tem Show, starring Temuera Morrison. Watson was appointed ambassador for Auckland Cancer Society in 2001 and 2002. In his role he helped launch the inaugural Relay for Life fundraising event.

It has been stated that The Tem Show could be renewed for a second season nearly a decade on, however Temuera Morrison has dismissed this speculation to date.

Views on immigration
In an interview with the New Zealand Listener, Watson railed against Asian immigration into Australia. He said "as an Australian living here [New Zealand] and with the full intention of staying here, [I say] beware immigration. Just look towards Australia [and what has happened there since] opening the floodgates to South-east Asia. Look at the growing population ... of crime, cultures that refuse to accept your culture." Watson, according to the Listener, felt that Asian immigrants had 'ruined' Sydney, and would hate the same to happen to Auckland.

References

1966 births
Living people
Australian businesspeople
Australian rugby league administrators
New Zealand Warriors administrators